John Rennie is an American college soccer coach. He was a five-time ACC Coach of the Year and the 1982 NSCAA Coach of the Year.

Career
He attended Chatham High School in New Jersey. He then played baseball, soccer, and tennis for the Temple Owls.

In 1972, he was the head men's soccer coach at Southeastern Massachusetts, where his team had a record of 12–4–3. He was the head coach for the Columbia Lions from 1973–1978. His Columbia teams went 4–32–4 from 1973–1975, but in 1978 he led Columbia to an Ivy League Championship and an NCAA Tournament appearance.

During his time at Duke he led the team to five NCAA College Cups in 1982, 1986, 1992, 1995, and 2004. His team's 1986 national championship was Duke's first in any sport.

Rennie finished his career with 454 wins and is one of only eight coaches all-time to get 400 wins with a Division I program.

He was inducted into the North Carolina Soccer Hall of Fame in 2011 and the Duke Athletics Hall of Fame in 2013.

College head coaching record

See also
List of college men's soccer coaches with 400 wins

References

Living people
American soccer coaches
Chatham High School (New Jersey) alumni
Columbia Lions men's soccer coaches
Duke Blue Devils men's soccer coaches
Soccer players from New Jersey
Sportspeople from Morris County, New Jersey
Temple Owls men's soccer players
Temple Owls baseball players
Association footballers not categorized by position
Year of birth missing (living people)
Baseball players from New Jersey
1940s births
Association football players not categorized by nationality